David Rittich Jr. (born 19 August 1992) is a Czech professional ice hockey goaltender for the Winnipeg Jets of the National Hockey League (NHL). He has previously played for the Calgary Flames, Toronto Maple Leafs and Nashville Predators. Rittich was an NHL All-Star in 2020 and has represented his native Czech Republic internationally.

Playing career

Rittich made his Czech Extraliga debut with BK Mladá Boleslav during the 2014–15 Czech Extraliga season. After two successful performances in the ELH, Rittich was signed to a one-year, two-way contract on 10 June 2016, with the Calgary Flames of the National Hockey League (NHL).

Rittich made his NHL debut against the San Jose Sharks in the third period of the Flames' final regular season game of the year. He made nine saves on 10 shots after replacing Brian Elliott in the third period to finish the game with a 3–2 loss. Rittich recorded his first NHL win in the 2017–18 season on 25 November 2017, in a game against the Colorado Avalanche. In December 2017, the Flames traded their backup goaltender Eddie Läck away, making Rittich a full-time NHL goaltender for the first time as the backup to Mike Smith. In his first season with the club, Rittich finished with an 8–6–3 record. On 26 July 2018, the Flames re-signed Rittich to a one-year, $800,000 contract extension. On 10 November 2018, Rittich earned his first shutout in the NHL against the Los Angeles Kings in a 1–0 win with the only goal scored by Travis Hamonic. In July 2019 the Flames re-signed David Rittich to a two-year contract. In the shortened 2020–21 season, on 22 February 2021, Rittich turned aside 34 shots to become the third goaltender in Flames' history to shutout the Toronto Maple Leafs, and the first since Yves Bélanger accomplished the feat on 31 December 1977, when the franchise was located in Atlanta. It was Rittich's fourth career shutout.

In the final year of his contract, Rittich was traded by the Flames at the NHL deadline on 11 April 2021, to the Toronto Maple Leafs as goaltending depth in exchange for a third-round pick in the 2022 NHL Entry Draft. He made four regular season appearances with the Maple Leafs, posting a 1–1–1 record, but was a healthy scratch during the playoffs.

As a free agent, Rittich was signed to a one-year, $1.25 million contract with the Nashville Predators on 28 July 2021.

Following a lone season with the Predators, Rittich left as a free agent and was signed to a one-year, $900,000 contract with the Winnipeg Jets on 13 July 2022.

Career statistics

Regular season and playoffs

International

Awards

References

External links
 

1992 births
Living people
BK Mladá Boleslav players
Calgary Flames players
Czech expatriate ice hockey players in Canada
Czech expatriate ice hockey players in the United States
Czech ice hockey goaltenders
HC Dukla Jihlava players
National Hockey League All-Stars
Sportspeople from Jihlava
Stockton Heat players
Toronto Maple Leafs players
Undrafted National Hockey League players
Winnipeg Jets players